In chemistry, cyclopentadienyl is a radical with the formula C5H5.

The cyclopentadienyl anion (formally related to the cyclopentadienyl radical by one-electron reduction) is aromatic, and forms salts and coordination compounds.

See also
Cyclopentadienyl anion, [C5H5]−
Cyclopentadienyl cation, [C5H5]+
Cyclopentadiene, C5H6
Methyl radical, [CH3]•

References

Free radicals
Five-membered rings